Alias Jesse James is a 1959 American Western comedy film directed by Norman Z. McLeod and starring Bob Hope and Rhonda Fleming. Based on a story by Robert St. Aubrey and Bert Lawrence, the film is about an outlaw who tries to kill an insurance agent who has been mistaken for him in order to collect on a big policy. Costumes by Edith Head.

Plot
Milford Farnsworth (Hope) is a bumbling insurance agent who unknowingly sells a life insurance policy to the outlaw Jesse James (Wendell Corey). Farnsworth is sent out West to shield the insurance company's investment by "protecting" James.

James has his own plan: to have Farnsworth killed while the insurance man is dressed as the outlaw, so that James and his soon to be "widow" Cora Lee Collins (Rhonda Fleming) can collect on the $100,000 insurance policy. Farnsworth avoids several attempts on his life while he and Collins fall in love,

After the last attempt is made on his life, Farnsworth impersonates the justice of the peace who is supposed to marry James and Collins. When Farnsworth and Collins make a run for it, they end up in a gun battle with the James Gang; several Western heroes make their cameos to surreptitiously help Farnsworth. In the end Farnsworth is celebrated as a hero, marries Collins, and becomes president of the insurance company.

Cast
 Bob Hope as Milford Farnsworth 
 Rhonda Fleming as Cora Lee Collins 
 Wendell Corey as Jesse James
 Gloria Talbott as Princess Irawanie
 Jim Davis as Frank James
 Will Wright as Titus Queasley 
 Mary Young as 'Ma' James
 Jack Lambert as Snake Brice
 Mickey Finn as Tough #2 in Dirty Dog Saloon 
 Bob Gunderson as James Gang member 
 Fred Kohler, Jr. as James Gang member
 Ethan Laidlaw as James Gang member 
 Glenn Strange as James Gang member

Cameo appearances
The gunfight scene at the end of the film features a number of cameo appearances by movie and television personalities who help Farnsworth and Collins defeat the James Gang. Though none are identified by character name in the film, each actor is dressed to resemble the iconic western character he or she played, and they each speak dialogue that echoes their famous catchphrases or identifiable habits:

 Fess Parker as Davy Crockett
 Gary Cooper as Will Kane from High Noon
 Roy Rogers (as himself)
 Jay Silverheels as Tonto
 Hugh O'Brian as Wyatt Earp
 James Arness as Marshal Matt Dillon
 Ward Bond as Major Seth Adams from Wagon Train (final film)
 Gail Davis as Annie Oakley
 Bing Crosby, dressed in western regalia, also makes an appearance at the gunfight's climax
 Scatman Crothers as a train porter
Following the theatrical release of the film, some later versions did not include all the cameos due to myriad legal problems with the rights, but Hope's clout at the time was so great that he managed to gather a dazzling array of screen cowboys for the original. The 2007 "MGM Movie Legends" DVD release of the film includes all of the cameos.

See also
 List of American films of 1959

References

External links
 

1959 films
American historical comedy films
Films directed by Norman Z. McLeod
American Western (genre) comedy films
1950s historical comedy films
1950s Western (genre) comedy films
Biographical films about Jesse James
Cultural depictions of Wyatt Earp
1959 comedy films
1950s English-language films
1950s American films